Indoor hockey at the Indoor Africa Cup was first introduced at the 2017 Men's African Hockey Indoor Cup of Nations in Swakopmund, Namibia.

Men's tournament

Results

Summary

* = hosts

Team appearances

Women's tournament

Results

Summary

* = hosts

Team appearances

References

Africa